Hohenzollern may refer to:  

 House of Hohenzollern, German dynasty which ruled Brandenburg-Prussia, Germany, and Romania, among other states
 County of Hohenzollern, the ancestral possession of the dynasty
 House of Hohenzollern-Sigmaringen, a cadet branch of the Hohenzollern dynasty
 House of Hohenzollern-Hechingen, the seniormost branch of the Hohenzollern dynasty
 House of Hohenzollern-Haigerloch, medieval German county
 Burg Hohenzollern, Swabian castle and ancestral seat of the Hohenzollern dynasty
 Province of Hohenzollern (1850–1945), Prussian province
 Hohenzollern (mountain), Baden-Württemberg, Germany
 Hohenzollern (ship), yachts of the German Emperors
 House Order of Hohenzollern, chivalric order
 Crown of Wilhelm II, also known as the Hohenzollern Crown
 Hohenzollern Locomotive Works, a German locomotive-building company
 Württemberg-Hohenzollern (1945–1952), a state of West Germany

See also
Battle of the Hohenzollern Redoubt, battle of World War One (25 September – 15 October 1915)